The 1968 Asian Men's Softball Championship was an international softball tournament which was held in Manila, Philippines. This is the first edition of the tournament.

Participants

References

Asian Men's Softball Championship
International softball competitions hosted by the Philippines
1968 in Philippine sport